The Jardin des Serres d'Auteuil is a botanical garden set within a major greenhouse complex located at the southern edge of the Bois de Boulogne in the 16th arrondissement, with entry at 1 avenue Gordon-Bennett, Paris, France.

The site first served as a botanical garden in 1761 under Louis XV. Today's greenhouses were designed and constructed in 1895-1898 by architect  Jean-Camille Formigé (1845-1926). In 1998 they became part of the Jardin botanique de la Ville de Paris.

Today the greenhouses produce about 100,000 plants per year for the interior decoration of municipal buildings. Exhibition greenhouses contain palm trees, succulents, and tropical collections, with substantial representation of Araceae, Begoniaceae, Bromeliaceae, Codiaeum, Peperomia, Philodendron, Rhipsalis, Rhododendron, Streptocarpus sect. Saintpaulia, and Zingiberaceae.

See also 
 List of botanical gardens in France

References 

 Jardin des Serres d'Auteuil 
 BGCI entry
 French Gardening entry 
 1001 Fleurs entry (French)
 Conservatoire des Jardins et Paysages entry (French)
 Wikimapia entry
 Jardin des Serres d'Auteuil, Paris

Serres d'Auteuil, Jardin des
Serres d'Auteuil, Jardin des
Serres d'Auteuil, Jardin des
Greenhouses in France
Art Nouveau architecture in Paris